Michał Buczek (born 19 September 1992, in Prudnik), also known as Z.B.U.K.U is a Polish hip hop musician and songwriter.

Discography

Albums

Singles

Music videos

References 

1992 births
People from Prudnik
Living people
Polish rappers
Male rappers
Polish hip hop singers